Igor Ivanovich Belanov or Ihor Ivanovych Bielanov (born 25 September 1960) is a Ukrainian former professional footballer who played as a striker.

He made a name for himself at Dynamo Kyiv, winning five major titles and being named European Footballer of the Year in 1986. He then spent six years in Germany with Borussia Mönchengladbach in the Bundesliga and Eintracht Braunschweig in the 2. Bundesliga, with little success.

Belanov represented the Soviet Union at one World Cup and one European Championship.He was included in the list of the top 100 World Cup footballers of all time by The Guardian in 2014. In 2011, he, Oleh Blokhin and Vitaliy Starukhin were named as the "legends of Ukrainian football" at the Victory of Football awards.

Club career

Beginnings and Dynamo Kyiv
Belanov was born in Odesa, Ukraine, Soviet Union. He started playing professionally in his hometown, with SKA Odesa and FC Chornomorets Odesa, joining country giants FC Dynamo Kyiv in 1985, and scoring ten goals in his first season, which ended with league and cup conquest.

Along with teammates Oleh Blokhin and Oleksandr Zavarov, Belanov led the scoring charts at the 1985–86 UEFA Cup Winners' Cup (five apiece) as Dynamo won the competition for the second time. He played the full 90 minutes in the final against Atlético Madrid (3–0).

Germany
Midway through 1989, 29-year-old Belanov got the long-awaited clearance to join a Western European side, making a move to Germany to join Borussia Mönchengladbach. His debut in the Bundesliga came on 4 November 1989 in a 4–0 away defeat against VfB Stuttgart, but he failed to impress overall, scoring only four goals in his one-and-a-half-season stint. 

Belanov's reputation at the club diminished further in January 1990, when he and his wife were among five Soviet citizens arrested for shoplifting clothes worth 2,000 Deutsche Mark; they were both convicted. He had faced financial problems due to his demand to be paid in U.S. dollars, which he trusted more than the mark, but which had suddenly declined in value.

Belanov moved to 2. Bundesliga's Eintracht Braunschweig in January 1991. He made his debut for his new club on 23 February, and went on to net just 13 times in the competition in three seasons combined, also suffering relegation in 1992–93 without making a single appearance.

Retirement
In 1995 Belanov returned home to Chernomorets for one season, retiring at almost 37 after a spell with FC Illychivets Mariupol, appearing in only five games in two seasons combined.

International career
Belanov played 33 matches for the Soviet Union, scoring eight goals. His best performance came at the 1986 FIFA World Cup in Mexico, where he netted four and assisted for six others as the team (which comprised 13 Dynamo Kyiv players) reached the round-of-16; he scored a hat-trick in the game against Belgium, in a losing extra time effort (4–3).

This performance at the World Cup, along with Dynamo's Cup Winners' Cup success, helped Belanov win the European Footballer of the Year award. He was also part of the squad that reached the final of UEFA Euro 1988, where the national side faced the Netherlands. With the score at 2–0 for the Netherlands, USSR were awarded a penalty: he took it, but saw goalkeeper Hans van Breukelen save his effort as the score remained 2–0 until full time, giving the Netherlands the European title. He won 33 caps between 1985 and 1990.

Style of play
Belanov was noted for his athleticism, in particular for his running speed and powerful goal strikes. He was one of the fastest sprinters among Soviet footballers of all times, together with Oleh Blokhin. However, while Blokhin was trained by his parents, who were both competitive sprinters, Belanov never received a formal sprint training; yet he ran the 50 metres in a hand-timed 5.7 seconds, corresponding to a mere 0.3 seconds slower than the world record at the time.

Post-retirement
Belanov turned to business after finishing his playing career. He returned to prominence when he became the majority shareholder at Switzerland's FC Wil, in August 2003. His predecessor, banker Andreas Hafen, had been given a five-year prison sentence after embezzling 51 million Swiss francs ($40 million) from the UBS Bank.

Belanov's first move at Wil was replacing first-team manager Martin Andermatt with his former Dynamo Kyiv teammate Oleksandr Zavarov, not taking note of the fact that he lacked the necessary UEFA licence to manage a European top-division outfit. That circumstance forced Belanov to sign former FC Karl-Marx-Stadt manager Joachim Müller. Due to the appointment of Müller, Zavarov's job was officially described as director of football; Müller did not last long as coach however, as Belanov sacked him just after three months, replacing him with Tomáš Matějček.

Matejcek's strict training regiment caused a quick revolt amongst Wil players. This forced Belanov to make amends for his decisions and to re-appoint Müller as manager, and hand the assistant-manager role to former Swiss international goalkeeper Stephan Lehmann. Those turned out to be Belanov's last series of actions as Wil's major shareholder as, in a quick sequence, he pulled out of his chairman and shareholder role of the club.

Additionally, Belanov also owned a football school in Odesa, Ukraine, which carried his name.

In 2018 joined the board of strategic development Ukrainian Association of Football.

Due to the Russian invasion of Ukraine 2022, Belanov joined the Territorial Defence Battalion (of the Ukrainian Armed Forces) of his hometown Odesa.

Career statistics

Club

International

Scores and results list Soviet Union's goal tally first, score column indicates score after each Belanov goal.

Honours
Dynamo Kyiv
UEFA Cup Winners' Cup: 1985–86
Soviet League: 1985, 1986
Soviet Cup: 1985, 1987, 1990
Soviet Super Cup: 1986, 1987
UEFA Super Cup: runner-up 1986

Chornomorets Odesa
Ukrainian Premier League: runner-up 1995–96

Soviet Union
UEFA European Football Championship: runner-up 1988

Individual
 Ballon d'Or: 1986
 UEFA Cup Winners' Cup: top scorer 1985–86
 World Soccer magazine's Player of the Year: runner-up 1986
 FIFA World Cup Bronze Boot: 1986
Top assist provider: UEFA Euro 1988
 The World Cup's top 100 footballers of all time, by The Times
 Merited Master of Sports: 1986
 The best 33 football players of the Soviet Union (4): 1985 — No. 3, 1986 — No. 1, 1987 — No. 3, 1988 — No. 3
 FIFA XI: 1991, 1998
 Golden Foot: 2008, as a legend

References

External links

 Profile at UkrSoccerHistory 
 
 
 
 

1960 births
Living people
Footballers from Odesa
Soviet footballers
Ukrainian footballers
Association football forwards
Soviet Top League players
Ukrainian Premier League players
SKA Odesa players
FC Chornomorets Odesa players
FC Dynamo Kyiv players
FC Mariupol players
Bundesliga players
2. Bundesliga players
Borussia Mönchengladbach players
Eintracht Braunschweig players
Soviet Union international footballers
1986 FIFA World Cup players
UEFA Euro 1988 players
Soviet expatriate footballers
Ukrainian expatriate footballers
Expatriate footballers in Germany
Ballon d'Or winners
Soviet expatriate sportspeople in Germany
Ukrainian expatriate sportspeople in Germany
Recipients of the Order of Merit (Ukraine), 1st class
Recipients of the Order of Prince Yaroslav the Wise, 5th class
Ukrainian military personnel of the 2022 Russian invasion of Ukraine
Territorial Defense Forces of Ukraine personnel
Military personnel from Odesa